The brown springsnail, scientific name Pyrgulopsis sola, is a species of very small freshwater snail that has a gill and an operculum, an aquatic gastropod mollusk in the family Hydrobiidae. This species is endemic to Arizona, the United States.

References

Pyrgulopsis
Freshwater animals of North America
Molluscs of the United States
Endemic fauna of Arizona
Gastropods described in 1988
Taxonomy articles created by Polbot